Nanne Sluis (born 13 May 1983) is a Dutch rower. He competed at the 2012 Summer Olympics in London in the Men's Pair event together with his teammate Meindert Klem. They finished fifth in the B finals, earning them an eleventh place overall.

References

1983 births
Living people
Rowers at the 2012 Summer Olympics
Dutch male rowers
Olympic rowers of the Netherlands
People from Willemstad